Wife Wanted (also known as Wanted - A Wife) is a 1915 American silent short comedy-drama film directed by Henry Otto starring Ed Coxen, John Steppling, and Winifred Greenwood.

Cast
 Ed Coxen as Andy Fortune
 Winifred Greenwood as Ruth Moore
 John Steppling as J.D.P. Moore
 George Field as Count Raphio
 William Bertram
 Charlotte Burton

External links

1915 films
1915 comedy-drama films
1910s English-language films
American silent short films
American black-and-white films
Films directed by Henry Otto
1915 short films
1910s American films
Silent American comedy-drama films
Comedy-drama short films